Kozjane is a settlement in the Municipality of Divača in the Littoral region of Slovenia.

References

External links

Kozjane at Geopedia

Populated places in the Municipality of Divača